Antonio Derrell Goss (born August 11, 1966) is an American football coach and former player.  He is the defensive backs and special teams coach at Carson–Newman University, a position he has held since 2018.  Goss played professionally as a linebacker in the National Football League (NFL) for seven seasons with the San Francisco 49ers and St. Louis Rams.  He won two Super Bowl rings with the 49ers and captain alongside Jerry Rice and Tim McDonald in Super Bowl XXIX.

Goss was a standout in high school sports, lettering in football, basketball, track, and baseball. His athleticism earned him All-American honors in football during his senior year.  Goss was  key member of Randleman's 2A state championship teams in 1981, 1982, and 1983 and was named captain of his football team his senior year.  He was inducted into the Randleman High School Sports Hall Fame in 2013.

References

External links
 Carson–Newman profile
 East Tennessee State profile
 

1966 births
Living people
American football linebackers
Buffalo Bulls football coaches
Carson–Newman Eagles football coaches
East Tennessee State Buccaneers football coaches
Furman Paladins football coaches
Louisville Cardinals football coaches
Middle Tennessee Blue Raiders football coaches
North Carolina Central Eagles football coaches
North Carolina Tar Heels football players
San Francisco 49ers players
St. Louis Rams players
High school football coaches in North Carolina
People from Randleman, North Carolina
Coaches of American football from North Carolina
Players of American football from North Carolina
African-American coaches of American football
African-American players of American football
20th-century African-American sportspeople
21st-century African-American sportspeople